The following are airports serving the Durban area.

List

See also

List of airports in South Africa

References 

South African Air Force Bases

External links
 Lists of airports in South Africa:
 Great Circle Mapper
 FallingRain.com
 Aircraft Charter World
 The Airport Guide
 World Aero Data
 A-Z World Airports
 Durban International Airport home page
 AFB Durban home page
 Dube Tradeport website (King Shaka International Airport)

Buildings and structures in Durban
Buildings and structures in KwaZulu-Natal
List, Durban
Transport in Durban
Airports, Durban
Airports
Airports, Durban